Whiteley is a surname. Notable people with the surname include:

Aliya Whiteley (born 1974), British novelist
Andrew John Whiteley (1947–2014), English chess master
Arkie Whiteley (1964–2001), Australian actress who appeared in television and films
Arthur Whiteley (1916-2013), American zoologist
Bobby Whiteley (1870-1938), English rugby union player
Brian Andrew Whiteley (born 1983), American visual artist
Brett Whiteley (1939–1992), Australian artist
Brett Whiteley (politician) (born 1960), Australian politician and a member of the Liberal Party in Tasmania
Cecil Whiteley (1875-1942), English judge
Charles Whiteley (born 1885), English footballer
David Whiteley (born 1977), the presenter of the BBC TV documentary programme Inside Out - East
Eli L. Whiteley (1913–1986), first lieutenant in the US Army, received the Medal of Honor for his actions in Sigolsheim, France during World War II
Eric Whiteley (1904-1973), English rugby union player
Frank Y. Whiteley, Jr., (1915–2008), racehorse trainer
Garett Whiteley (born 1980), American mixed martial artist
George Whiteley, 1st Baron Marchamley PC (1855–1925), Liberal Party politician in the United Kingdom
Greg Whiteley (born 1969), American executive producer
Harvey Whiteley (born 1998), English rugby league footballer
Helen Riaboff Whiteley (1921-1990), Chinese-American microbiologist
Jenny Whiteley (born 1971), Canadian country and folk singer-songwriter
John Whiteley (disambiguation), multiple people
Johnny Whiteley (1930-2022), English former rugby league footballer and coach
Jon Whiteley (1945-2020), Scottish actor and art historian
Ken Whiteley (born 1951), Canadian-American multi-instrumentalist
Laurence Whiteley (born 1991), British rower
Lee Whiteley (born 1989), British sprinter
Lisa Whiteley (born 1993), Australian rules footballer
Lynda Whiteley (born 1963), English former athlete
Mark Whiteley (born 1962), American editor
Martha Annie Whiteley (1866–1956), English chemist
Opal Whiteley (1897–1992), nature writer and diarist
Peter Whiteley (disambiguation), multiple people
Richard Whiteley (disambiguation), multiple people
Ross Whiteley (born 1988), English cricketer
Sheila Whiteley (1941–2015), English musicologist
Tom Whiteley (born 1995), English rugby union player
Walter Whiteley, Canadian mathematician
Warren Whiteley (born 1987), South African rugby player
Wendy Whiteley OAM (born 1941), Australian artist and cultural icon
Wilfrid Whiteley (1882–1970), British Labour Party politician
William G. Whiteley (1819–1886), United States Representative from Delaware
William Henry Whiteley (1834–1903), inventor best known for the cod trap which he invented in 1865
William Whiteley, (1831–1907), British entrepreneur of the late nineteenth and early twentieth centuries
William Whiteley (politician), CH, DL (1881–1955), the Labour Member of Parliament for Blaydon in County Durham, England